Monstera epipremnoides is a species of flowering plant in the family Araceae, endemic to Costa Rica. A clone in cultivation was formerly thought to be of this species, but after comparison with wild populations of M. epipremnoides, the plant in cultivation has since been registered as a cultivar of the name Monstera 'Esqueleto'.

References

esqueleto
Plants described in 1905
Endemic flora of Costa Rica